West Tisbury is the name of two places:
West Tisbury, Wiltshire, England, a civil parish
West Tisbury, Massachusetts, United States